Three regiments of the British Army have been numbered the 118th Regiment of Foot:

118th Regiment of Foot formed in 1761 by the regimentation of independent companies and disbanded in 1762.
118th Regiment of Foot (1794), an infantry regiment formed in 1794 
The 118th Regiment of Foot (Invalids) formed in 1762, renumbered as the 75th the following year and disbanded in 1768 or 1769.